The table below details the complete World Championship Grand Prix results for the March Formula One team. The second table includes results from privately owned March cars in World Championship Grands Prix.

Complete Formula One World Championship results

Works team results
(key)
Notes

† – The driver did not finish the Grand Prix, but was classified, as they completed over 90% of the race distance.
‡ – Half points awarded as less than 75% of the race distance was completed.

Results of other March cars
(key)

Formula One constructor results